The 1866 Mount Herbert by-election was a by-election held  on 27 July in the  electorate in Canterbury during the 4th New Zealand Parliament.

He was replaced by Thomas Potts.

Potts was the only nomination, so was declared elected unopposed.

References 

 

Mount Herbert, 1866
1866 elections in New Zealand
July 1866 events
Politics of Canterbury, New Zealand